Liang Wenbo (born 25 March 1987) is a Chinese professional snooker player. He turned professional in 2005 and has won one ranking title, at the inaugural English Open in 2016. With teammate Ding Junhui, he has twice won the World Cup for China in 2011 and 2017. He has reached one Triple Crown final at the 2015 UK Championship, where he lost to Neil Robertson. He made three consecutive Masters appearances between 2016 and 2018, but lost in the first round each time, to John Higgins, Ronnie O'Sullivan, and Judd Trump respectively. His best performance in the World Championship has been reaching the quarter-finals in 2008, where he lost to O'Sullivan. He has made three maximum breaks in professional competition and achieved a career high of 11th in the snooker world rankings.

Following a domestic assault conviction, the World Professional Billiards and Snooker Association (WPBSA) suspended Liang from professional competition from 2 April until 1 August 2022 for behaviour unbecoming of a sportsperson and for bringing the sport into disrepute.

The WPBSA suspended Liang again on 27 October 2022 amid a match-fixing investigation that subsequently implicated ten Chinese players. In January 2023, the WPSBA charged him with fixing matches, approaching players to fix matches, seeking to obstruct its investigation, and failing to cooperate with the investigation. He will remain suspended until the disciplinary process concludes.

Career

Amateur years
As an amateur, Liang's major feats were as follows:

 2003 IBSF World Snooker Championship, men's division, quarter-finalist
 2004 IBSF World Snooker Championship, under-21 division, semi-finalist
 2005 International Open Series, under-21 division, no. 4 runner-up

Liang built on the positive start to his snooker career, winning an individual silver medal and a team gold medal at the 2006 Asian Games.

2004/2005
Liang began his professional career during the 2004–05 snooker season playing on the Challenge Tour, which is the tier below the World Snooker Association Main Tour. He finished a mediocre 104th out of 168 competitors, having only accumulated 2150 points.

2005/2006
Liang received a wildcard nomination to the Main Tour despite not qualifying directly; this was because he won the 2005 IBSF World Under-21 Championship, and also because not all of the players that were eligible for the Main Tour took their places. In his first ranking tournament, the Grand Prix, he lost in the first qualifying round to Rory McLeod 2–5. He fared better in the next ranking event, the UK Championship, where he almost whitewashed Alfred Burden in the first qualifying round 9–1, but subsequently lost in the second qualifying round to Marcus Campbell by the narrowest of margins, 8–9.

Liang qualified for his first ranking event at the Welsh Open, beating Sean Storey, Jamie Burnett and Rory McLeod to reach the main draw. He defeated Nigel Bond in the first round 5–0, but his run was halted when he lost to Graeme Dott 3–5.

At the Malta Cup, however, he lost in the first qualifying round to Paul Davies 3–5. At the China Open, he beat David McDonnell and Matthew Couch before losing against Adrian Gunnell 3–5 in the third qualifying round. He ended the season falling at the first hurdle at the World Championship, losing to Joe Delaney 5–10 in the first qualifying round. Liang ended his debut season on the professional tour ranked 78th, a position that would not guarantee a place in the following season's tour; however, he had finished inside the top 8 of the one year ranking list, which qualified him for a place on the main tour for the next season.

2006/2007
During the 2006–07 season, Liang reached at least the second round of qualifying in every ranking event. At the Northern Ireland Trophy, he beat Robert Stephen 5–0 before falling to David Gilbert 0–5 in qualifying. However, at the Grand Prix, Liang came top of his qualifying group, above more experienced players such as Gerard Greene and Barry Pinches. He finished fourth in his group at the round-robin stage, and although he did not progress to the next round, he did beat former world champion and world number one Stephen Hendry 3–0. At the UK Championship, he lost in the second round of qualifying to Jamie Burnett 7–9. In the following ranking event, the Malta Cup, he lost to Joe Jogia 3–5, again in the second round of qualifying. He qualified for the Welsh Open, his third ranking tournament, by beating Dene O'Kane, Joe Jogia and Mark Davis. He met Nigel Bond again in the last 48, this time losing only 3–5.

At the China Open, he continued his run of reaching the second round of qualifying in every ranking tournament, and beat Robert Stephen before losing to Finland's Robin Hull. At the World Championship, he beat Jeff Cundy before losing to Mike Dunn. After a modest season, he improved on his tour ranking by finishing in 66th place, just outside the top 64; and he topped the one year ranking list to ensure his place on the WSA Tour for next season.

2007/2008
Liang started the season by almost qualifying for the Shanghai Masters, however Nigel Bond beat him 5–3 in the last qualifying round, preventing him from appearing at his home tournament. At the Grand Prix, he could not repeat the success of last season and failed to qualify, finishing third on frame difference. He had more luck at the next tournament, the Northern Ireland Trophy, where he won through the qualifying rounds, beating Fraser Patrick, Joe Delaney and Rory McLeod on the way. He faced Gerard Greene in the last 48, but lost 2–5. He had less success at the UK Championship, losing in the second qualifying round to David Roe 2–9. He also failed to qualify for the Welsh Open, when he was dispatched in the last qualifying round by Andrew Norman 2–5. He fell at the first hurdle at his other home tournament, the China Open, losing in the first qualifying round to Steve Mifsud, who at the end of this season was ranked 54 places below Liang.

At the World Championship, Liang was the third Chinese player to qualify for the main draw, defeating Ben Woollaston, Rod Lawler, David Gilbert and Ian McCulloch in the qualifying rounds. He met Ken Doherty in the first round of the championship, and defeated him 10–5. Before the start of this match, he accidentally entered the arena at the same time as the match officials and had to hurry back; he subsequently received a warm ovation when he entered the arena for a second time after being introduced by MC Rob Walker. For every session thereafter, Walker introduced him as "Should he stay or should he go... Liang Wenbo", despite the rhyme occurring due to a mispronunciation of his name ("bo" is pronounced "bwor" in Chinese).

Liang faced Northern Ireland's Joe Swail in the last 16 of the tournament. In a humorous incident, Liang fluked a red after scattering the balls, but failed to notice and went back to his seat. To the amusement of the spectators, Swail pointed out the mistake and the referee called Liang back to the table. In the 23rd frame, with a 12–10 lead, Liang prematurely celebrated winning the match after potting "match ball", only to then lose the frame due to a snooker; Swail came back to level the match at 12–12. In the final frame, Liang made early breaks of 34 and 30. He missed the final yellow but snookered Swail, leaving the cue ball in the jaws of the pocket. Liang followed up with a safety shot but Swail snookered him behind the blue; Liang failed to hit the yellow ball so Swail had the white replaced. In his second attempt, Liang hit the yellow directly and went on to win the frame 74–34, and thus the match, 13–12.

The incident in the last frame proved controversial as the referee replaced the cue ball in the wrong position, giving Liang a better sight of the yellow. At the time, Swail nodded his assent to the referee, but he complained in a post-match interview that Liang had behaved unprofessionally by not pointing out the referee's error. Commentators countered that Swail should have queried the placement of the ball before Liang took his shot, and that, given the tension of the situation, Liang could be forgiven for not thinking clearly.

Liang faced eventual champion Ronnie O'Sullivan in the quarter-final, taking the first two frames with a break of 80 in the first, but O'Sullivan had levelled the match 4–4 by the end of the first session. O'Sullivan eased ahead in the second session and eventually won the match 13–7. Liang's run to the quarter-finals of the World Championship gained him 5000 ranking points, boosting his final ranking to number 40 in the world. This guaranteed that he would only have to win two qualifying matches to enter the main draw of the ranking tournaments the following season.

2008/2009
Liang began the new season by qualifying for the last 48 of the Northern Ireland Trophy. He then beat Steve Davis and Peter Ebdon to reach the last 16, where he lost to John Higgins 1–5. This result lifted him to a provisional career high of 26 in the world. He reached the main draw of the Grand Prix by winning two qualifying matches, but then succumbed to Ronnie O'Sullivan in the first round of the main draw. He then made a 147 and three other centuries (including two total clearances of 139) in a 5–1 victory over Martin Gould in the third qualifying round of the Bahrain Championship. However, he failed to qualify for the main draw, losing 2–5 to Michael Judge.

For the two Chinese events on this season's tour, Liang's two qualifying matches were held over until the venue stages. At the 2008 Shanghai Masters, he defeated Atthasit Mahitthi and Mark Allen to reach the main draw, but lost to Ryan Day 0–5 in the first round. Ironically, his second qualifying match for the Welsh Open was held over to ensure that his Welsh opponent Dominic Dale played at the main venue in Newport.

Liang ended the season at the World Championship, after defeating Dave Harold 10–3 in the last qualifying round. He lost in the first round of the main draw 8–10 against Ding Junhui.

2009/2010
In July 2009, Liang won his first professional title, the Beijing International Challenge, beating world number 2 Stephen Maguire 7–6 in the final. He made a further breakthrough in August when he reached the final of the Shanghai Masters, becoming only the second Chinese player, and the fourth Asian man, to reach a ranking final. He ultimately finished runner-up to Ronnie O'Sullivan.

Liang qualified for the Grand Prix but was defeated 2–5 by Peter Ebdon in the first round, winning the first two frames and losing the last five in succession. Prior to this meeting, he had played Ebdon twice, winning 5–1 and 5–0. He reached the quarter-finals of the UK Championship after defeating Ryan Day 9–3, and Mark King 9–2. He went on to lose 2–9 to John Higgins in the quarter-finals. He failed to qualify for the Welsh Open and the China Open, as he lost 3–5 against Michael Judge and 2–5 against Andrew Higginson respectively.

Liang qualified for the World Championships by defeating Rod Lawler 10–2. He was drawn against Ronnie O'Sullivan, but lost 7–10. After the quarter-finals of the event, it was clear that Liang would be ranked as number 16 the following season, the only new player entering the top 16 that season.

2010/2011

Liang began the season at the Wuxi Classic, where he lost in the first round 2–5 against Marco Fu. He participated at the Beijing International Challenge to defend his first professional title, but lost in the semi-finals 4–6 against eventual winner Tian Pengfei. Liang failed to qualify for the World Open, as he lost 1–3 against Andrew Higginson and lost his first round match at the Shanghai Masters 3–5 against Matthew Stevens. Having started the season inside the top 16, his results were not sufficient to maintain that position and he slipped out of the top 16. After this, he lost his qualifying matches in the five ranking tournaments.

Liang also participated at the Players Tour Championship, his best performance coming at the third European event, where he reached the final, but lost 0–4 against Marcus Campbell. After 12 out of 12 events, he was ranked 14th in the Players Tour Championship Order of Merit. He lost his first round match at the Finals 1–4 against Ricky Walden.

2011/2012
Liang and Ding Junhui represented China at the World Cup and they won in the final 4–2 against the Northern Ireland team. During his match against Matthew Stevens in the first round of Australian Goldfields Open, Liang had a chance to make his second maximum break in his career, but he snookered himself on the yellow ball, and the break ended at 120. He won the match 5–4 to reach the second round, where he lost 4–5 against Ken Doherty. He also qualified for the Shanghai Masters, but lost in the first round 1–5 against Neil Robertson. After this, he was unable to qualify for the next two ranking events, as he lost 2–6 against Michael White at the UK Championship, and 3–5 against Liu Chuang at the German Masters.

In December 2011, Liang joined Romford-based snooker Academy and management team Grove Leisure.
He beat David Gilbert and Rory McLeod, both 4–1, to reach the first round of the Welsh Open, where he faced John Higgins and was this time on the wrong end of a 4–1 scoreline. He narrowly missed out on a place in the World Open as he was defeated 4–5 by Mark King in the final round of qualifying. He also lost in qualifying for the China Open to the eventual winner of the event Peter Ebdon 0–5.

Liang played in eleven of the twelve minor-ranking PTC events throughout the season, with a best finish in Event 10, where he lost in the quarter-finals to Dominic Dale. He also reached the last 16 in two other events to finish 38th in the PTC Order of Merit, outside of the top 24 who qualified for the Finals.

He qualified for the World Championship by defeating Marcus Campbell 10–9. He had led the match 8–2 and 9–5 before Campbell took it to 9–9, at which point the match was suspended to allow players on the other tables to begin their sessions. Liang subsequently won the decider with a 72 break and played defending champion Higgins again in the first round. He was involved in another final-frame decider, but was this time on the losing end as he bowed out of the tournament on the opening day, 9–10. He finished the season ranked world number 37.

2012/2013
Liang lost in qualifying for both the Wuxi Classic and the Shanghai Masters to Rod Lawler. He reached the venue stage of the Australian Goldfields Open by beating Thanawat Thirapongpaiboon, but lost 3–5 in the first round against Matthew Stevens. Liang beat Anthony McGill and Andrew Higginson to qualify for the UK Championship, where he saw a 4–3 lead in the first round against Barry Hawkins turn into a 4–6 defeat. Liang failed to qualify for the next two events, but won two matches to enter the main draw of both the Welsh Open and the China Open. In Wales he lost 2–4 to local favourite Stevens in the first round, and in his homeland of China he beat Lu Ning 5–1 in the wildcard round, before losing 3–5 to Stuart Bingham in the first round. Liang had a very consistent season in the Players Tour Championship series as he advanced to, but not past, the last 16 in five of the ten events. This saw him placed 27th on the PTC Order of Merit, one spot short of making the Finals. Liang's season ended when he was beaten 6–10 by Mark Davis in the final round of World Championship Qualifying. His end of year ranking was world number 32.

2013/2014

In July 2013, Liang reached the final of the World Games but lost in the gold medal match 0–3 to Aditya Mehta. He had an excellent season in the Asian Tour events by reaching the semi-finals of the Zhangjiagang Open where he was defeated 1–4 by Michael Holt and at the Zhengzhou Open, where Liang won his first individual title on the World Snooker Tour. He beat Anthony McGill 4–3 in the semi-finals before whitewashing Lü Haotian 4–0 to claim the £10,000 first prize. In the full ranking events, Liang won five successive frames against defending world champion Ronnie O'Sullivan in the second round of the International Championship to triumph 6–4 which marked his first ever success over his opponent having lost in all four previous attempts. He then thrashed Mark Davis 6–1 to reach the quarter-finals of a ranking event for the first time in four years, where he lost 3–6 against Graeme Dott. Liang reached the last 16 of both the German Masters and Welsh Open, losing 2–5 to Mark Davis and 2–4 to Barry Hawkins respectively. A second final on the Asian Tour followed at the Dongguan Open where Stuart Bingham made four breaks above 50 to defeat him 4–1, but Liang still topped the Order of Merit to qualify for the Finals. There, he was beaten 2–4 by Yu Delu and Liang was defeated 7–10 by Martin Gould in the final round of World Championship qualifying.

2014/2015
Liang overcame Jamie Burnett 5–1 in the first round of the 2014 Wuxi Classic, and then inflicted the first defeat on Mark Selby since he won the World Championship, beating him 5–3. In the last 16, Liang was knocked out 2–5 by Joe Perry. He lost 3–5 against Robert Milkins in the opening round of the Australian Goldfields Open, and in the wildcard round of the Shanghai Masters 1–5 to Yan Bingtao. He failed to get past the last 64 of the next two ranking events, but won two matches to reach the German Masters, where he eliminated Li Hang 5–1 in the first round. He reached the quarter-finals by coming back from 3–4 down against Stuart Bingham to win 5–4 on the final pink. He repeated this form when he edged Ryan Day 5–4 to play in his second career ranking event semi-final, where he took four frames in a row to hold a narrow 4–3 advantage over Shaun Murphy, before losing three successive frames in a 4–6 defeat. Liang did not drop a single frame in seeing off Cao Xinlong and Gerard Greene at the Welsh Open, but was then the victim of a whitewash by John Higgins in the third round. At the inaugural World Grand Prix, he lost 3–4 to Graeme Dott in the second round. In the final round of World Championship qualifying, he lost the last three frames against compatriot Zhang Anda to be narrowly defeated 9–10.

2015/2016
Liang was heavily beaten 2–8 by Thepchaiya Un-Nooh in the final of the 2015 Six-red World Championship. In the third round of the UK Championship, he took advantage of a collapse from Judd Trump to win 6–4 after trailing 1–4. He then saw off Tom Ford 6–5, after which Ford accused Liang of "boring him off the table" with slow play. Liang responded by opening his quarter-final match against Marco Fu with three centuries and hung on to edge it 6–5, then came from 2–4 behind to reach the final by beating David Grace 6–4. It was the first final in the history of the event to feature two players from outside the United Kingdom; Liang lost the match 5–10 to eventual UK champion Neil Robertson. A week later, he progressed to the semi-finals of the Gibraltar Open, but was whitewashed 0–4 by Fu.

Liang's UK final helped him break back into the top 16 in the world rankings to make his debut at the Masters, where he was knocked out 4–6 by John Higgins in the opening round. He was whitewashed 0–4 by Shaun Murphy in the quarter-finals of the World Grand Prix. After winning three matches to qualify for the World Championship, Liang lost 8–10 to Judd Trump after an earlier 7–3 lead.

2016/2017 
In the first round of the Shanghai Masters, Liang was narrowly beaten 4–5 by Ronnie O'Sullivan. He won five matches at the English Open, which included a 4–3 second round victory over Shaun Murphy, to reach the semi-finals. From 3–4 down, Liang made breaks of 134 and 138 and Stuart Bingham made a 116 to lock the score at 5–5. Liang took the decider and then ended Judd Trump's 14-match winning streak in the final to win his maiden ranking title 9–6. He became the second player from mainland China to win a ranking event and thanked O'Sullivan (with whom he practises daily) for his help. The win also gave him entry to his first Champion of Champions where he lost 0–4 in the opening round to Mark Selby.

In the Scottish Open, Liang reached the quarter-finals, where he lost to Yu Delu 4–5. In the Masters, he missed the final black, which would have seen him eliminate O'Sullivan 6–4 in the opening round of the Masters, instead going on to lose 5–6. A 4–0 thrashing of Dominic Dale and a pair of 4–3 victories over Mark Allen and Joe Perry moved Liang into the semi-finals of the World Grand Prix, where he was defeated 1–6 by Barry Hawkins. In the second round of the World Championship, Liang trailed Ding Junhui 2–6 after the first session and 7–9 after the second. He then won a trio of frames to take the lead in the match for the first time and would have been 12–11 ahead, one frame away from reaching the quarter-finals for the second time, but instead lost 12–13. After the event, his end-of-season ranking rose to 11, which was a career-high.

2017/2018 
Though Liang had a decent campaign this season, he was unable to reach the same height as previous season. In his first round match against Ronnie O'Sullivan at the Masters. In a best -of-11 match, Liang led 5-4 up and only needed the final black in the 10th frame to guarantee his place in the quarter final; however, he missed the relatively easy black, and subsequently lost the frame and eventually the match. In his match against Rod Lawler in the World Championship Qualifying round, Liang made a 147 in the 10th frame, the third 147 in his career. But interestingly, he also had a chance to make another 147 in the 12th frame, but he missed the tricky final black.

2018/2019 
Liang had a somewhat of a down season in the 2018/19 campaign. His best results came in the European Masters, China Open, and China Championship, in which he advanced to the third round. Liang only earned a total of 78,500 ranking points, which was 141,100 points shy from his best season in 2016/2017.

2019/2020 
This season Liang saw some improvement in this form. His best result came in the UK Championship, in which he defeated Dominic Dale, David Grace, Eden Sharav, and Li Hang, before losing to the eventual champion Ding Junhui in the quarter final. Liang also reached the quarter final of the Gibraltar Open, losing 4–1 to Judd Trump.

Legal and disciplinary issues

Domestic assault conviction 
In the early hours of 20 July 2021, Liang was captured on CCTV repeatedly punching and kicking a woman during an argument in Sheffield city centre. The victim also made an emergency call, during which she was reported to be screaming in distress. After pleading guilty to domestic assault at Sheffield Magistrates' Court on 9 February 2022, Liang was sentenced on 1 April 2022 to a 12-month community order plus a £1,380 fine. Sheffield Heeley MP Louise Haigh called the outcome "a shockingly pathetic sentence for such a violent and appalling assault" and called for Liang to be barred from the upcoming 2022 World Snooker Championship.

On 2 April 2022, the day after Liang's sentencing, the World Professional Billiards and Snooker Association (WPBSA) suspended him from professional competition with immediate effect, making him ineligible to compete in the World Championship qualifiers, which began on 4 April. The WPBSA held a disciplinary hearing on 26 May 2022, where Liang accepted he had breached WPBSA Members' Rules and his contract with World Snooker Limited by engaging in behaviour unbecoming of a sportsperson and by bringing the sport into disrepute. The WPBSA suspended him from 2 April until 1 August 2022 and ordered him to pay £1,000 towards the costs of the hearing. Liang returned to competition at the 2022 British Open qualifiers.

Match-fixing investigation 
The WPBSA suspended Liang again on 27 October 2022 for alleged misconduct unrelated to his domestic assault conviction. The WPBSA later disclosed that Liang had been suspended amid a match-fixing investigation. Nine other Chinese players were subsequently suspended as part of the same investigation, one of whom, Chang Binyu, alleged on Weibo that Liang had threatened him before his match against Jamie Jones at the 2022 British Open, ordering him to lose the match by a specific scoreline. In January 2023, Liang was charged with “being concerned in fixing matches and approaching players to fix matches on the World Snooker Tour, seeking to obstruct the investigation and failing to cooperate with the WPBSA investigation”. The nine other players also face charges relating to match fixing. An independent disciplinary tribunal will consider the evidence against them.

Personal life
Liang is married to Chen Xuejiao; they have one child.

In 2020, prior to the World Grand Prix, Liang had pledged to donate any money he would receive at the tournament to the Huizhou Red Cross in response to the coronavirus outbreak in China.

Performance and rankings timeline

Career finals

Ranking finals: 3 (1 title)

Minor-ranking finals: 3 (1 title)

Non-ranking finals: 5 (1 title)

Pro-am finals: 2

Team finals: 4 (2 titles)

Amateur finals: 1 (1 title)

References

External links

Liang Wenbo at worldsnooker.com

1987 births
Living people
Chinese snooker players
People from Suihua
Sportspeople from Heilongjiang
Asian Games medalists in cue sports
Asian Games gold medalists for China
Asian Games silver medalists for China
Medalists at the 2006 Asian Games
Medalists at the 2010 Asian Games
Cue sports players at the 2006 Asian Games
Cue sports players at the 2010 Asian Games
World Games silver medalists
Competitors at the 2013 World Games
21st-century Chinese people